2nd Conference was the tournament of Shakey's V-League (SVL) from 2005 and 2007-2010.

List of 2nd Conference Champions

Per season

Per Team

References